The 2016 OVC softball championship was held May 11-14 at Choccolocco Park in Oxford, Alabama. This marked the 23rd time the championship had been held and the fourth year it featured eight teams. This year was the first year it was held at the neutral site in Oxford instead of at the site of the No. 1 seed.  The tournament winner earned the OVC's automatic bid to the 2016 NCAA Division I softball tournament. All games were streamed courtesy of the OVC Digital Network.

The defending champion was Tennessee Tech which won its seventh OVC Championship in 2015.

Results

References

Tournament
Ohio Valley Conference softball tournament